Yuliya Viktorovna Ivanova (born 5 December 1977) is a Russian former rhythmic gymnast. She won a bronze medal in the group competition at the 1996 Summer Olympics in Atlanta.

In group all-around competition, Ivanova also won a gold medal at the 1994 World Rhythmic Gymnastics Championships in Paris and finished in fourth place at the  1996 World Rhythmic Gymnastics Championships in Budapest.

References

External links
 
 

1977 births
Living people
Russian rhythmic gymnasts
Olympic gymnasts of Russia
Olympic bronze medalists for Russia
Olympic medalists in gymnastics
Gymnasts at the 1996 Summer Olympics
Medalists at the 1996 Summer Olympics
Medalists at the Rhythmic Gymnastics World Championships
Sportspeople from Volgograd
20th-century Russian women
21st-century Russian women